"Bart on the Road" is the twentieth episode of the seventh season of the American animated television series The Simpsons. It originally aired on the Fox network in the United States on March 31, 1996. In the episode, Bart makes his own fake driver's license. He rents a car with it and takes Milhouse, Martin, and Nelson on a road trip to Knoxville, Tennessee. Their car is destroyed, leaving them stranded. To get Bart home, Homer orders equipment for the power plant and ships it via courier from Knoxville, with the boys stowed away inside the crate.

The episode was written by Richard Appel, and directed by Swinton O. Scott III. The idea of a road trip was "so exciting" that the writers immediately knew they wanted to write it. The episode features cultural references to the 1991 film Naked Lunch, American singer Andy Williams, and Look magazine.

Since airing, the episode has received positive reviews from television critics; Central Michigan Life named it the eighth-best episode of the series. It acquired a Nielsen rating of 7.2, and was the fifth-highest-rated show on the Fox network the week it aired.

Plot
Principal Skinner sends the Springfield Elementary students on a "go to work with your parents day" (a low-rate version of Work Experience and made up on the fly), after several administrative errors force him to go on his spring break vacation earlier than he planned. Unable to stay home with Marge because school forms state that homemaker is not a "real job", Bart goes to the DMV with Patty and Selma, and Lisa goes to the Springfield Nuclear Power Plant with Homer. At the DMV, Bart makes himself a fake driver's license, which he, Nelson, Martin, and Milhouse use to rent a car. They include Martin in their plans after learning that he earned some money by investing in futures.

Using an alibi concocted by Bart, the boys tell their parents they are travelling to the National Grammar Rodeo in Canada. After travelling aimlessly for a while, they decide to use the rented car for a road trip to the World's Fair in Knoxville, Tennessee. Once they arrive, they discover the fair was held fourteen years earlier; all that remains is a wig outlet. The boys each buy a wig and Martin spends the last of their money on an Al Gore doll. When Nelson accidentally knocks the Sunsphere (renamed the Wigsphere) on their car, crushing it, they are left stranded.

Bart places a collect call to Lisa — who has spent the entire spring break with Homer at work — to help him return home while concealing the ordeal from their parents. On her advice, Bart becomes a courier. However, as he fails to earn enough money to get home and as none of his assignments get him anywhere near Springfield (his first involving flying organ transplants to Hong Kong), Bart again asks Lisa for help. After making Homer promise he will not get upset, Lisa reveals Bart's predicament. To get Bart home, Homer orders equipment for the power plant from Oak Ridge, Tennessee, pouring cola over his work station in order to justify it. He ships it from nearby Knoxville, with Bart as the courier and the boys stowed inside the crate.

While Lisa and Homer quietly fume at Bart at the dinner table, Marge remains clueless about his misadventures. At night, Marge receives telephone calls alluding to Bart's mishaps from Principal Skinner (who spotted him in Hong Kong), the Tennessee State Police, and the courier service. Homer nervously ducks under the covers and quietly laughs as Marge remains oblivious.

Production

The episode was written by Richard Appel, who wanted to do an episode that had two things; a "go to work with your parents day" and Bart getting a driver's license. The "go to work with your parents day" idea appealed to Appel because it was something he "lost the right" to do when he went from public school to private school as a child. Appel considered those days to be his favorites because he "didn't have to do anything" at his parents' job. The idea of having a driver's license was something that Appel dreamed about when he was younger.

The writing staff had never done a spring break episode before so they thought, "What would Lisa and Bart do on spring break?" and came up with the road trip plot. Bill Oakley, the show runner of The Simpsons at the time, said that road trips were something that the writers liked to write stories about. The idea of four children going on a road trip was "so exciting" that they immediately knew they wanted to write it. There was a debate over where the children would go, and Fort Lauderdale, Florida, was first suggested, but the writers eventually decided to have them go to a "funny unlikely place". Oakley's show runner partner, Josh Weinstein, said that the writers were always looking for combinations of characters that had not been done many times on the show. Homer and Lisa had not been done "too often" and they wanted the two characters to bond and get closer to each other.

The episode was directed by Swinton O. Scott III. It was difficult to animate because the animators had to draw completely new designs for the locations outside of Springfield, such as Knoxville. The car scenes were also difficult to animate. At the time, The Simpsons was using traditional animation without computers, but they had to get one for a scene where the camera spins around the car from above. The car was difficult to animate because it had to "look real" and not "boxy like a truck". The car was based on a 1993 Oldsmobile car with rounded edges. The Simpsons animator David Silverman said that the episode was "probably the most difficult one" Scott had to direct on the show.

Cultural references
Bart and his friends use Bart's fake license to see the R-rated 1991 film Naked Lunch, an adaptation of William Burroughs's novel dealing with heroin addiction, homosexuality, and hallucinogens. While leaving the theater after viewing the film, Nelson Muntz remarks, "I can think of at least two things wrong with that title." The boys also see an Andy Williams concert in Branson, Missouri, and the marquee advertising it outside reads "Wow, he's still got it – Look magazine", with Look having been out of business for 25 years when the episode first aired. On the road, the boys pick up a hitchhiker, who is based on the hitchhiker in the Texas Chainsaw Massacre horror film series. Principal Skinner books a vacation with AmeriWestica, a parody of America West Airlines. "Radar Love" by Dutch rock band Golden Earring is also heard.

Reception
In its original broadcast, "Bart on the Road" finished 63rd in the ratings for the week of March 25 to March 31, 1996, with a Nielsen rating of 7.2. The episode was the fifth highest-rated show on the Fox network that week, following The X-Files, Cops, Party of Five, Martin, and Melrose Place.

Since airing, the episode has received positive reviews from television critics. The authors of the book I Can't Believe It's a Bigger and Better Updated Unofficial Simpsons Guide, Warren Martyn and Adrian Wood, said that it "contains some superb touching character scenes between Homer and Lisa, a fascinating glimpse of Marge's insecurities, and some nice touches that take it above the show's very high average."

Dave Foster of DVD Times said that "Bart on the Road" is an episode which is built upon a "frankly ludicrous" idea which if the writers were to "stumble upon" now, "we'd simply see Bart happen upon a license and skip town without anyone noticing, but here they do give the setup a great deal of consideration both on and off the screen." He thought the story was "partly believable, though the opportunity when Bart hits the road is largely wasted with only a few well constructed jokes to speak of." Foster thinks, "what saves the episode is the opportunity to see Lisa and Homer connect, once again displaying what a strong season this is for Lisa as we see the two share some wonderfully tender moments, alongside some genuinely laugh-out-loud moments."

DVD Movie Guide's Colin Jacobson enjoyed the episode and said that he "loves" the children's experiences at their parents' jobs, adding, "and when they head out of town, the fun continues. Any episode that sends the kids to the site of the World's Fair is OK by me."

Jennifer Malkowski of DVD Verdict considered the best part of the episode to be when Patty and Selma explain their job at the DMV: "Somedays we don't let the line move at all. We call those weekdays." Malkowski concluded her review by giving the episode a grade of B+. John Thorpe of Central Michigan Life named it the eighth best episode of the series. Robert Canning of IGN gave the episode a score of 9.5 out of 10, calling it "outstanding" and summarizing his review with: "'Bart on the Road' is a fun trip and very funny, but it's the way everything comes together that really makes it memorable."

References

External links

The Simpsons (season 7) episodes
1996 American television episodes
Culture of Knoxville, Tennessee
Television episodes set in Tennessee
World's fairs in fiction
Television episodes set in Hong Kong
1982 World's Fair

it:Episodi de I Simpson (settima stagione)#Bart girandolone